Allsortsia is a genus of leaf beetles in the subfamily Spilopyrinae. It contains only one species, Allsortsia maculata. It is found only in Australia, in the tropical rainforest of north Queensland.

The genus is named after liquorice allsorts, which A. maculata vaguely resembles.

A. maculata is known only from two type specimens collected in 1909 from Kuranda, adjacent to the Wet Tropics.

References

External links
 Australian Faunal Directory – Genus Allsortsia Reid & Beatson, 2010

Monotypic Chrysomelidae genera
Beetles of Australia